Afterwards is a 1928 British silent drama film directed by Lawson Butt and starring Marjorie Hume, Julie Suedo and Joseph R. Tozer. It was made at Bushey Studios, and based on a novel by Kathlyn Rhodes.

Cast
 Marjorie Hume - Mrs Carstairs
 Julie Suedo - Tocati
 Joseph R. Tozer - Doctor Anstice
 Cecil Barry - Bruce Cheniston
 Dorinea Shirley - Iris Wayne
 Jean Jay - Hilda Ryder
 Pat Courtney - Cherry
 Fewlass Llewellyn - Sir Richard Wayne
 Frank Perfitt - Major Carstairs

References

Bibliography
 Low, Rachael. History of the British Film, 1918–1929. George Allen & Unwin, 1971.

External links

1928 films
1928 drama films
British drama films
British silent feature films
1920s English-language films
Bushey Studios films
Films based on British novels
Films set in England
British black-and-white films
1920s British films
Silent drama films